In mathematics, a skeleton of a category is a subcategory that, roughly speaking, does not contain any extraneous isomorphisms. In a certain sense, the skeleton of a category is the "smallest" equivalent category, which captures all "categorical properties" of the original. In fact, two categories are equivalent if and only if they have isomorphic skeletons. A category is called skeletal if isomorphic objects are necessarily identical.

Definition 

A skeleton of a category C is an equivalent category D in which no two distinct objects are isomorphic. It is generally considered to be a subcategory. In detail, a skeleton of C is a category D such that:

 D is a subcategory of C: every object of D is an object of C 

for every pair of objects d1 and d2 of D, the morphisms in D are morphisms in C, i.e.

and the identities and compositions in D are the restrictions of those in C.
 The inclusion of D in C is full, meaning that for every pair of objects d1 and d2 of D we strengthen the above subset relation to an equality:

 The inclusion of D in C is essentially surjective: Every C-object is isomorphic to some D-object.
 D is skeletal: No two distinct D-objects are isomorphic.

Existence and uniqueness 

It is a basic fact that every small category has a skeleton; more generally, every accessible category has a skeleton. (This is equivalent to the axiom of choice.) Also, although a category may have many distinct skeletons, any two skeletons are isomorphic as categories, so up to isomorphism of categories, the skeleton of a category is unique.

The importance of skeletons comes from the fact that they are (up to isomorphism of categories), canonical representatives of the equivalence classes of categories under the equivalence relation of equivalence of categories. This follows from the fact that any skeleton of a category C is equivalent to C, and that two categories are equivalent if and only if they have isomorphic skeletons.

Examples 

The category Set of all sets has the subcategory of all cardinal numbers as a skeleton.
The category K-Vect of all vector spaces over a fixed field  has the subcategory consisting of all powers , where α is any cardinal number, as a skeleton; for any finite m and n, the maps  are exactly the n × m matrices with entries in K.
FinSet, the category of all finite sets has FinOrd, the category of all finite ordinal numbers, as a skeleton.
The category of all well-ordered sets has the subcategory of all ordinal numbers as a skeleton.
A preorder, i.e. a small category such that for every pair of objects , the set  either has one element or is empty, has a partially ordered set as a skeleton.

See also 
 Glossary of category theory
 Thin category

References

 Adámek, Jiří, Herrlich, Horst, & Strecker, George E. (1990). Abstract and Concrete Categories. Originally published by John Wiley & Sons. . (now free on-line edition)
 Robert Goldblatt (1984). Topoi, the Categorial Analysis of Logic (Studies in logic and the foundations of mathematics, 98). North-Holland. Reprinted 2006 by Dover Publications.

Category theory